Denis Petrić (born 24 May 1988) is a  professional footballer who plays as a goalkeeper for Nantes in France.

Club career
In 2016 Petrić joined Ligue 1 club Angers.

International career
Petrić was born and raised in Slovenia, and played for their youth teams before switching to the Serbia U21 team. He has not made a senior appearance, and is eligible for either the Slovenian or Serbian national teams.

Honours
Troyes
Ligue 2: 2014–15

Angers
Coupe de France runner-up: 2016–17

Guingamp
Coupe de la Ligue runner-up: 2018–19

Individual
Ligue 2 Goalkeeper of the Year: 2015
Ligue 2 UNFP Team of the Year: 2014–15

References

External links
 
 
 

Living people
1988 births
Footballers from Ljubljana
Serbian footballers
Slovenian footballers
Slovenia under-21 international footballers
Slovenian people of Serbian descent
Association football goalkeepers
Ligue 2 players
Ligue 1 players
Championnat National players
AJ Auxerre players
SO Cassis Carnoux players
FC Istres players
ES Troyes AC players
Angers SCO players
En Avant Guingamp players
FC Nantes players
Slovenia youth international footballers
Expatriate footballers in France